Stuart Richard Beattie (born 10 July 1967) is a Scottish former footballer who played as a defender.

Beattie joined Rangers from Ardeer Recreation Boys Club. He made five league appearances for the club but injuries dogged his progression. He left the club and later joined English side Doncaster Rovers making 26 league appearances and netting his first career goal before retiring in 1989.

References

External links

1967 births
Living people
Scottish footballers
Association football defenders
Rangers F.C. players
Doncaster Rovers F.C. players
Scottish Football League players
English Football League players